|}
{| class="collapsible collapsed" cellpadding="0" cellspacing="0" style="clear:right; float:right; text-align:center; font-weight:bold;" width="280px"
! colspan="3" style="border:1px solid black; background-color: #77DD77;" | Also Ran

The 1990 Epsom Derby was a horse race which took place at Epsom Downs on Wednesday 6 June 1990. It was the 211th running of the Derby, and it was won by Quest for Fame. The winner was ridden by Pat Eddery and trained by Roger Charlton. The pre-race favourite Razeen finished fourteenth.

Race details
 Sponsor: Ever Ready
 Winner's prize money: £355,000
 Going: Good
 Number of runners: 18
 Winner's time: 2m 37.26s

Full result

* The distances between the horses are shown in lengths or shorter. hd = head; nk = neck.† Trainers are based in Great Britain unless indicated.

Winner's details
Further details of the winner, Quest for Fame:

 Foaled: 15 February 1987 in Great Britain
 Sire: Rainbow Quest; Dam: Aryenne (Green Dancer)
 Owner: Khalid Abdullah
 Breeder: Juddmonte Farms
 Rating in 1990 International Classifications: 123

Form analysis

Two-year-old races
Notable runs by the future Derby participants as two-year-olds in 1989.

 Karinga Bay – 1st Washington Singer Stakes, 7th Horris Hill Stakes
 Linamix – 1st Prix La Rochette, 2nd Grand Critérium
 Missionary Ridge – 6th National Stakes, 3rd Horris Hill Stakes
 Digression – 1st Royal Lodge Stakes
 Bastille Day – 12th Cartier Million

The road to Epsom
Early-season appearances in 1990 and trial races prior to running in the Derby.

 Quest for Fame – 2nd Chester Vase
 Blue Stag – 1st Dee Stakes
 Elmaamul – 1st Easter Stakes, 7th 2,000 Guineas, 2nd Predominate Stakes
 Kaheel – 3rd Heron Stakes
 Karinga Bay – 3rd Sandown Classic Trial, 2nd Dante Stakes
 Duke of Parducah – 2nd Feilden Stakes
 Zoman – 2nd Poule d'Essai des Poulains
 Treble Eight – 7th Feilden Stakes, 4th Derby Italiano
 Linamix – 1st Prix de Fontainebleau, 1st Poule d'Essai des Poulains
 Missionary Ridge – 4th Sandown Classic Trial, 3rd Chester Vase
 Digression – 5th Predominate Stakes
 Sober Mind – 4th Warren Stakes, 3rd Prix Hocquart, 19th Derby Italiano
 Razeen – 1st Predominate Stakes
 Bastille Day – 6th Irish 2,000 Guineas
 Mr Brooks – 2nd Gladness Stakes, 5th Irish 2,000 Guineas

Subsequent Group 1 wins
Group 1 / Grade I victories after running in the Derby.

 Quest for Fame – Hollywood Invitational Turf Handicap (1992)
 Elmaamul – Eclipse Stakes (1990), Phoenix Champion Stakes (1990)
 Zoman – Prix d'Ispahan (1992), Washington, D.C. International Stakes (1992)
 Mr Brooks – July Cup (1992), Prix de l'Abbaye de Longchamp (1992)

Subsequent breeding careers
Leading progeny of participants in the 1990 Epsom Derby.

Sires of Classic winners
Linamix (9th)
 Amilynx - 1st Prix Royal-Oak (1999, 2000)
 Vahorimix - 1st Poule d'Essai des Poulains (2001)
 Slickly  - 1st Prix du Moulin de Longchamp (2001)
 Valiramix - 1st Bula Hurdle (2001)

Sires of Group/Grade One winners
Quest For Fame (1st)
 Sarrera - 1st Doomben Cup  (2008)
 Viscount - 1st George Main Stakes (2001)
 De Beers - 1st Rosehill Guineas (2006)
 Dame d'Harvard - Dam of Harchibald
Elmaamul (3rd) 
 Muhtathir - 1st Prix Jacques Le Marois (2000)
 Sweet Return - 1st Hollywood Derby (2003)
 Risk Seeker - 1st Sagaro Stakes (2004)
 Habbie Simpson - 3rd Classic Novices' Hurdle (2011)

Sires of National Hunt horses
Karinga Bay (5th)
 Coneygree - 1st Cheltenham Gold Cup (2015)
 Quwetwo - 1st Morebattle Hurdle (2010)
 General Miller - 1st Top Novices' Hurdle (2010)
 Megalex - Dam of Ballyandy and Megastar

Other Stallions
Blue Stag (2nd) - Exported to BrazilKaheel (4th) - Exported to West IndiesDuke of Paducah (6th) - Exported to AmericaMissionary Ridge (10th) - Exported to AmericaDigression (11th) - Exported to AmericaRazeen (14th) - Exported to IndiaRiver God (16th) - Minor jumps winnerAromatic (17th) - Exported to America

References

External links
 Colour Chart – Derby 1990

Epsom Derby
 1990
Epsom Derby
20th century in Surrey
Epsom Derby